The Achille Independent School District is a school district based in Achille, Oklahoma (United States). There are two schools in the district.

List of schools
Achille High School, high school

Achille Elementary School, pre-school through 8th grade

Yuba Elementary School, pre-school through 6th grade (closed in May 2010 due to budget cuts)

2018 school closure
In August 2018, threatening Facebook comments were made by a group of adults after a 12-year-old transgender student had used a girls bathroom, rather than a staff bathroom as she had done in previous years.  A small peaceful rally in support of the student followed at the school.  In consultation with law enforcement and fire department officials, Achille Public Schools closed for two days, partly out of concerns about counter-protesters and safety.

See also
List of school districts in Oklahoma

References

External links
 Achille Independent School District Homepage

School districts in Oklahoma
Education in Bryan County, Oklahoma